Zypora Spaisman (January 2, 1916 in Lublin, Poland – May 18, 2002 in New York City) was an actress and Yiddish theatre empresaria.

Life in Poland
Born Zypora Tannenbaum, she worked in her native Poland as a midwife for many years, delivering hundreds of children, including during World War II when she witnessed horrendous suffering. After emigrating to the United States in 1954, she became an actress.

Career in the United States

Spaisman, during her career as an actress, was long associated with the Folksbiene Yiddish Theatre in NYC and, along with Morris Adler, kept it alive for 42 years. Following a dispute with the Folksbiene's new management in 1998, she founded the Yiddish Public Theatre.

The Folksbiene Yiddish Theatre, originally located on the Lower East Side of Manhattan in what was then known as the Forward Building and later ensconced across from the Central Synagogue in its Community House building (both locations during Spaisman's tenure), is the longest-running Yiddish theatre company in the world. Founded in 1915 as an amateur group dedicated to producing non-commercial Yiddish theater and world drama in Yiddish translation, it turned professional in later decades.  It was sustained by Morris Adler, who joined the company in 1934, and Spaisman, who joined twenty years later. During Spaisman and Adler's tenure, the Folksbiene remained a bastion for Yiddish literary culture. 

In 1998, Ms. Spaisman's position with the company was taken over by Zalmen Mlotek and Eleanor Reissa, who were then named co-artistic directors. They invited Spaisman to stay on as a "consultant" but she opted to start her own company, the Yiddish Public Theater, which endured for one year before its demise.

Zypora Spaisman assayed the role of Sheva Haddas in Paul Mazursky's film  Enemies, a Love Story (1989), an adaptation of Isaac Bashevis Singer's novel of the same name.

A documentary by Dan Katzir about Spaisman and her Yiddish Public Theater, Yiddish Theater: A Love Story, was released to much acclaim in 2006.

In the summers, Zypora Spaisman worked as a camp nurse at Camp Boiberik, in Rhinebeck, NY. The camp was an offshoot of The Sholem Aleichem Folk Institute.

Death
She was married to Joseph Spaisman until his death; the couple had one son, who survived her following her sudden and unexplained death from cerebral trauma on May 18, 2002, aged 86.

References

External links
 IMDb bio
 "Yiddish Theater: A Love Story" official website

1916 births
2002 deaths
Yiddish theatre performers
Jewish American actresses
American film actresses
American stage actresses
Polish midwives
Holocaust survivors
Polish emigrants to the United States
Actors from Lublin
Actresses from New York City
20th-century American actresses
20th-century American Jews